Dennis Leroy Springer (born February 12, 1965) is an American former professional baseball right-handed pitcher, who played in Major League Baseball (MLB) for the Philadelphia Phillies, California Angels, Tampa Bay Devil Rays, Florida Marlins, New York Mets, and Los Angeles Dodgers. He is most remembered for his use of the knuckleball.

As a member of the Dodgers, Springer surrendered Barry Bonds' Major League record-setting 73rd home run on October 7, 2001. The homer came off a 3-2 pitch clocked at 43 miles per hour (a knuckleball) in the bottom of the first inning of Los Angeles' 2-1 loss to the San Francisco Giants.

In an 8-season career, he had a record of 24-48, with a 5.18 ERA in 655.1 innings pitched. He had four career shutouts, two of those coming in his time with the Marlins in 1999.

External links

Dennis Springer at Baseball Gauge
Dennis Springer at Ultimate Mets Database
Dennis Springer at Pura Pelota (Venezuelan Professional Baseball League)

1965 births
Living people
Albuquerque Dukes players
American expatriate baseball players in Canada
Anaheim Angels players
Bakersfield Dodgers players
Baseball players from California
California Angels players
California State University, Fresno alumni
Durham Bulls players
Florida Marlins players
Fresno State Bulldogs baseball players
Great Falls Dodgers players
Knuckleball pitchers
Las Vegas 51s players
Los Angeles Dodgers players
Major League Baseball pitchers
New York Mets players
Norfolk Tides players
Philadelphia Phillies players
Reading Phillies players
San Antonio Missions players
Scranton/Wilkes-Barre Red Barons players
Sportspeople from Fresno, California
Tampa Bay Devil Rays players
Tiburones de La Guaira players
American expatriate baseball players in Venezuela
Vancouver Canadians players
Vero Beach Dodgers players